The Kafka Effekt (2001) is the debut book of American author D. Harlan Wilson.  It contains forty-four irreal short stories and flash fiction and has been said to combine the milieus of Franz Kafka and William S. Burroughs.  Along with Carlton Mellick III's Satan Burger, Vincent Sakowski's Some Things Are Better Left Unplugged, Hertzan Chimera's Szmonhfu, Kevin L. Donihe's Shall We Gather at the Garden? and M.F. Korn's Skimming the Gumbo Nuclear, The Kafka  Effekt was among the first books jointly released by Bizarro fiction publisher Eraserhead Press.

2001 short story collections
Short story collections by D. Harlan Wilson
American short story collections
Franz Kafka